Xiaoping Station is a railway station of Guangzhou Metro Line 8, located at Shicha Road, Baiyun District, Guangzhou, Guangdong, China. The station opened on November 26, 2020 with the opening of the northern extension of Line 8.

Station layout
The station has an underground island platform. Platform 1 is for trains towards Jiaoxin, whilst platform 2 is for trains towards Wanshengwei.

Gallery

Reference

Railway stations in China opened in 2020
Guangzhou Metro stations in Baiyun District